Doroteo Guamuch Flores, also called Mateo Flores (February 11, 1922 – August 11, 2011), was a Guatemalan long-distance runner who won several international events, including the Boston Marathon in 1952.

Career
Guamuch was born in Cotió, Mixco, a city near Guatemala City. During his early athletic career, Guamuch worked in as a low-paid laborer in a textile factory. He would wake at 4:00 am to run for two hours, and run an additional two hours after returning from work at 6:00 pm.

Guamuch's career spanned from 1941 to 1957; prior to winning the 1952 Boston Marathon, he was the winner of multiple international races, notably the marathon at the 1946 Barranquilla Games, the half marathon at the 1950 Central American and Caribbean Games in Guatemala, and the marathon at the 1955 Pan American Games in Mexico City. He also participated in the 1952 Summer Olympics in Helsinki.

1952 Boston Marathon
On April 19, 1952, Guamuch participated in the Boston Marathon, a major international racing event. He took the lead from his countryman Luis H. Velasquez after the first ten miles, and, against any predictions, finished ahead of U.S. competitor Victor Dyrgall by almost five minutes, recording a time of 2 hours, 31 minutes, and 53 seconds. His record remained as a national record for Guatemala for seventeen years, until November 5, 1969, when it was broken by Julio Quevedo.

Honors and awards
The Boston achievement made Guamuch a sports icon in his country, and the Guatemalan government paid him tribute by renaming the national stadium in Guatemala City to Estadio Nacional Mateo Flores. He was treated as a national hero by the Guatemalan government, which also awarded him the Order of the Quetzal (the nation's highest civilian honor).

Life after retirement
Guamuch became a Professor of physical education after his retirement. He was also been a golf caddie working at the Guatemala Country Club and occasional player. He was a practicing Roman Catholic.

References and footnotes

External links
 Mateo Flores: racismo y nación en Guatemala - www.efdeportes.com - Biography and career

1922 births
2011 deaths
People from Guatemala Department
Guatemalan male long-distance runners
Guatemalan male marathon runners
Olympic athletes of Guatemala
Athletes (track and field) at the 1951 Pan American Games
Athletes (track and field) at the 1952 Summer Olympics
Athletes (track and field) at the 1955 Pan American Games
Order of the Quetzal
Pan American Games gold medalists for Guatemala
Pan American Games medalists in athletics (track and field)
Boston Marathon male winners
Central American and Caribbean Games gold medalists for Guatemala
Competitors at the 1946 Central American and Caribbean Games
Competitors at the 1954 Central American and Caribbean Games
Central American and Caribbean Games medalists in athletics
Medalists at the 1955 Pan American Games
20th-century Guatemalan people
21st-century Guatemalan people